Damon Daunno (born November 28, 1984) is an American actor and singer. A native of Glen Ridge, New Jersey, Daunno graduated from Tisch School of the Arts. He starred in the 2019 Broadway revival of Oklahoma! as Curly, for which he received a nomination for the 2019 Tony Award for Best Actor in a Musical.

Daunno originated the role of Orpheus in Hadestown in the Off-Broadway production which ran from May 6 to July 31, 2016, at New York Theatre Workshop. He appears on the Off Broadway Original Cast Recording.

In August 2020, Daunno was featured on the soundtrack Broadway Sings Blood Rock: The Musical with Andy Mientus, Jennifer DiNoia, and Robert Torti.

Theatre credits

Filmography

Awards and nominations

References

External links 
 
 
 

1984 births
Living people
American male musical theatre actors
American male stage actors
Male actors from New Jersey
People from Hanover Township, New Jersey
Tisch School of the Arts alumni